Comanche High School is a public high school located in Comanche, Texas, United States and is classified as a 3A school by the UIL. It is part of the Comanche Independent School District located in central Comanche County. In 2015, the school was rated "Met Standard" by the Texas Education Agency.

Athletics
The Comanche Indians and/or Maidens compete in the following sports:

 Baseball
 Basketball
 Cross Country
 Football
 Golf
 Powerlifting
 Softball
 Tennis
 Track & Field
 Volleyball

State Titles
Girls Basketball - 
1951(1A), 1998(3A)

State Finalist
Girls Basketball - 
1973(2A)

School Activities

Comanche supports many different school activities, including;
Marching Band
Guitar
Drama Club
Science Olympiad
DECA
FCCLA
Theater
One Act Play
FFA
Annual Staff
Student Chamber
National Honor Society
Student Cabinet
Small Schools
Student Council
FHLA
Auto Skills USA
Student Chamber
Junior Bank Board
FCS

References

External links
Comanche ISD

Public high schools in Texas
Education in Comanche County, Texas